Bradleigh Thomas Peter Donelan (born 3 January 1968) played first-class and List A cricket for Sussex between 1989 and 1993, and then a single first-class match for Somerset in 1994. Between 1995 and 1999, he played Minor Counties cricket for Cambridgeshire and in this period also appeared in List A matches for the county. He was born at Park Royal, Middlesex.

References

1968 births
Living people
English cricketers
Sussex cricketers
Somerset cricketers
Cambridgeshire cricketers